The Revolt of Querétaro was an armed conflict fought in 1823 and  waged by the Imperialist faction after the fall of the First Mexican Empire and the victory of the Casa Mata Plan Revolution.

Revolt 
On 12 December 1823, the 8th Regiment based in Santiago de Querétaro conducted a military rebellion led by a Spanish sergeant and an Andalusian from Cadiz, who arrested commander José Joaquín Calvo and other provisional authorities. They then seized the park and weapons and prepared to seize more territory outside the city.

Response 
General Nicolás Bravo, who after the Guadalajara rebellion, left with his forces for Guanajuato to act if needed, was in Celaya. He soon introduced himself to his forces and suppressed the rebels. With the approval of the government, he then disbanded the regiment and arrested the leader of the rebellion.

References 
 RIVA PALACIO, Vicente (1940). Mexico through the centuries: general and complete history of social, political, religious, military, artistic, scientific and literary development of Mexico from ancient times to the present time; work, unique in its kind. (GS López edition). Mexico.
 BUSTAMANTE, Carlos María de (1985).Continuation of the historical picture of the Mexican revolution, begun on September 15, 1810 by the citizen Miguel Hidalgo y Costilla, Cura of the town of Dolores. (Hellenic Cultural Institute edition). Mexico. .

Wars involving Mexico
Conflicts in 1823
Rebellions in Mexico
1823 in Mexico
Civil wars involving the states and peoples of North America